In chronological order, spacecraft are listed equipped with electric space propulsion. This includes both cruise engines and/or thrusters for attitude and orbit control. It is not specified whether the given engine is the sole means of propulsion or whether other types of engine are also used on a spacecraft. The list does not claim to be comprehensive.

Chronological overview

Planned missions

See also
 Lists of spacecraft

References

Spacecraft propulsion
Electric motors 
Electric propulsion